Cohors [prima] Cananefatium [quingenaria peditata] ("[1st infantry 500 strong] cohort of Cananefates") was a Roman auxiliary infantry regiment. The cohort stationed in Dacia at castra of Tihău.

See also 
 List of Roman auxiliary regiments

References
 Constantin C. Petolescu: Dacia - Un mileniu de istorie, Ed. Academiei Române, 2010, 
 Academia Română: Istoria Românilor, Vol. 2, Daco-romani, romanici, alogeni, 2nd. Ed., București, 2010, 

Military of ancient Rome
Auxiliary peditata units of ancient Rome
Roman Dacia